Khejenim     is a village development committee in the Himalayas of Taplejung District in the Province No. 1 of northeastern Nepal. At the time of the 2011 Nepal census it had a population of 2,406 people living in 480 individual households. There were 1,186 males and 1,220 females at the time of census.

References

External links
UN map of the municipalities of Taplejung District

Populated places in Taplejung District